"This Is Nightlife" is a song by German dance group ItaloBrothers. The song was released in Germany as a download on March 15, 2013. The song reached the Top 30 of Austria and Switzerland and the Top 50 in Germany. It uses many parts, for example the melody, of Sash!s track "Ecuador" from 1997.

Music video
The music video for the single was released on YouTube on March 13, 2013 at a total length of two minutes and forty-nine seconds, and was filmed in Frankfurt. It quickly received 700,000 views within the first two weeks.

Track listing
 Download
 "This Is Nightlife" (Video Edit) - 2:42
 "This Is Nightlife" (DJ Gollum Radio Edit) - 3:17
 "This Is Nightlife" (Cody Radio Edit) - 3:16
 "This Is Nightlife" (Extended Mix) - 3:58
 "This Is Nightlife" (DJ Gollum Remix) - 5:03
 "This Is Nightlife" (Cody Remix) - 5:11

Chart performance

Weekly charts

Year-end charts

Certifications

Release history

References

External links
 ItaloBrothers Official Website
 ItaloBrothers on Facebook
 ItaloBrothers on Twitter
 ItaloBrothers on MySpace
 ItaloBrothers YouTube channel

2013 singles
ItaloBrothers songs
2013 songs